Catullus 8 is a Latin poem of nineteen lines in choliambic metre by the Roman poet Catullus, known by its incipit, Miser Catulle.

Text

Analysis 
The speaker, somewhat vainly, appeals to himself to return Lesbia's coldness with coldness. E. T. Merrill says the puella of this poem is undoubtedly Lesbia, given the affection shown in verse 5 in particular, and in the poem as a whole. Catullus had evidently fallen in the favour of his inconstant mistress, and was ill able to put up with her coldness in a dignified manner. While, therefore, he complains of the unreasonableness of her treatment of him, he seems to have one eye open for a reconciliation. Merrill dates the poem to about 59 BC, noting the difference in tone from the "swift and brief-worded bitterness" that characterizes the poems written after the speaker had become convinced of Lesbia's unworthiness, and thinks this poem was evidently written in the time of temporary estrangement which was ended by the voluntary act of Lesbia.

In his Victorian translation of Catullus, R. F. Burton titles the poem "To Himself recounting Lesbia's Inconstancy".

References

Sources 
 Burton, Richard F.; Smithers, Leonard C., eds. (1894). The Carmina of Caius Valerius Catullus. London: Printed for the Translators: for Private Subscribers. pp. 14–15.
 Merrill, Elmer Truesdell, ed. (1893). Catullus (College Series of Latin Authors). Boston, MA: Ginn and Company. pp. 17–19.

Further reading 

 Akbar Khan, H. (1968). "Style and Meaning in Catullus' Eighth Poem". Latomus, 27. pp. 556–574.
 Connor, P. J. (1974). "Catullus 8: The Lover's Conflict". Antichthon, 8. pp. 93–96.
 Dyson, M. (1973). "Catullus 8 and 76". Classical Quarterly, 23. pp. 127–143.
 Moritz, L. A. (1966). "Miser Catulle: A Postscript". Greece and Rome, 13. pp 156–157.
 Rowland, R. L. (1966). "Miser Catulle: An Interpretation of the Eighth Poem of Catullus". Greece and Rome, 13. pp. 16–21.
 Schmiel, R. (1990). "The Structure of Catullus 8: A History of Interpretation". Classical Journal, 86. pp. 158–166.
 Skinner, M. B. (1971). "Catullus 8: The Comic Amator as Eiron". Classical Journal, 66. pp. 298–305.
 Swanson, R. A. (1963). "The Humor of Catullus 8". Classical Journal, 58. pp. 193–196.

External links 
 C. Valerius Catullus. "Catul. 8". Carmina. Leonard C. Smithers, ed. Perseus Digital Library. Retrieved 27 February 2023.

C008
Articles containing video clips